Whangape Harbour is a harbour on the west coast of Northland, New Zealand. There is a settlement called Whangape on the northern side of the harbour. Another, called Pawarenga, is located on the southern side. Kaitaia is 42 km north east.

The harbour is a narrow valley from the confluence of the Awaroa and Rotokakahi Rivers through hills to the Tasman Sea. The harbour entrance is treacherous. The Herekino Harbour and settlement are a few kilometres to the north, and the Hokianga is to the south and east.

History and culture

Pre-European history

According to Māori traditions, the waka Māmari, captained by Ruānui, settled the Whangape area after being forced out of the Hokianga during early Māori settlement of New Zealand. They established a large fortified pa at Pawarenga. Here they were attacked by a war party from the south, which greatly outnumbered them. The Ngāti Ruānui stacked brushwood about the pa, and set them alight before fleeing across the harbour on rafts, hidden by the clouds of smoke produced. They settled much of the far north, becoming known as Te Aupōuri ('au' means current and 'pōuri' smoke) after this event.

Edward Wakefield described the harbour in 1837, and estimated the local Māori population as "not fewer than one thousand souls".

European settlement

Whangape settlement became an important timber port in the late 19th and early 20th century. There was a large mill on the foreshore and numerous houses on the hills. Ships, initially sailing ships and later steamers, loaded the kauri timber and transported it to markets elsewhere. At least four ships were wrecked at the harbour entrance: the 79-ton schooner Leonidas in 1871, the 15-ton cutter Lionel in 1877 with all five on board lost, the 108-ton schooner Geelong in 1879 with two lives lost,  and most recently the River Hunter foundered in 1906 while under tow. Whangape was a location for the late 19th/early 20th century kauri gum digging trade.

Marae

Pawarenga has three marae affiliated with Te Uri o Tai, a hapū of Te Rarawa: Mōrehu Marae and Kurahaupō meeting house; Ōhākī Marae and Te Urunga Moutonu or Maru o te Huia meeting house; and Taiao Marae and Mātaatua meeting house. In October 2020, the Government committed $1,407,731 from the Provincial Growth Fund to upgrade Ōhākī Marae and 8 other marae of Te Rarawa, creating 100 jobs. It also committed $217,455 to upgrade Mataatua Marae, creating 14 jobs.

Whangape has one marae, Te Kotahitanga. It is affiliated with the Ngāpuhi hapū of Ngāti Kura, Ngāti Tautahi, Ngāti Whakaeke, Takoto Kē and Te Uri o Hua. In October 2020, the Government committed $90,424 to upgrade both it and Te Maata Marae, creating 12 jobs. It also committed $1,407,731 towards work on Te Kotahitanga and eight other marae.

Demographics
The SA1 area is part of the larger Herekino-Takahue statistical area.

The SA1 statistical area had a population of 96 at the 2018 New Zealand census, a decrease of 3 people (−3.0%) since the 2013 census, and a decrease of 21 people (−17.9%) since the 2006 census. There were 27 households, comprising 51 males and 45 females, giving a sex ratio of 1.13 males per female. The median age was 43.6 years (compared with 37.4 years nationally), with 27 people (28.1%) aged under 15 years, 15 (15.6%) aged 15 to 29, 36 (37.5%) aged 30 to 64, and 18 (18.8%) aged 65 or older.

Ethnicities were 40.6% European/Pākehā, 71.9% Māori, 12.5% Pacific peoples, and 3.1% other ethnicities. People may identify with more than one ethnicity.

Of those people who chose to answer the census's question about religious affiliation, 25.0% had no religion, 62.5% were Christian and 6.2% had Māori religious beliefs.

Of those at least 15 years old, 12 (17.4%) people had a bachelor's or higher degree, and 12 (17.4%) people had no formal qualifications. The median income was $18,500, compared with $31,800 nationally. 3 people (4.3%) earned over $70,000 compared to 17.2% nationally. The employment status of those at least 15 was that 18 (26.1%) people were employed full-time, 12 (17.4%) were part-time, and 0 (0.0%) were unemployed.

Education

Te Kura ā Iwi o Pawarenga is a coeducational full primary school serving years 1-8. It had a roll of  students as of  The school was founded in 2020 to replace Te Kura o Hata Maria o Pawarenga. It is a state kura-a-iwi designated character school, which teaches primarily in the Māori language.

Whangape Native School operated from 1881 to 1976, when it merged with Herekino School. Puketi and Makora Schools operated from 1894 to 1896.

Rotokakahi Native School (later called Rotokakahi Maori School) operated from 1918 to about 1969 on the harbour.

Te Kura o Hata Maria o Pawarenga was a Catholic primary school, founded in 1927. It subsequently became state-integrated, but closed in 2020 and was replaced by Te Kura ā Iwi o Pawarenga.

References

Far North District
Ports and harbours of New Zealand